Nusu may refer to:
Nusu language
Nu people or Nusu
NUSU, Newcastle University Students' Union